MythQuest is a Canadian children's television series that originally aired on PBS in 2001. Produced by Mind's Eye Entertainment, it stars Meredith Henderson and Christopher Jacot as Cleo and Alex Bellows, two teens whose father Matt disappears into the Cyber Museum, a computer program that, as they discover, allows them to travel into myths by touching an artifact on the screen.

They become characters in the myths, and strive to keep the myth to its normal progression; a difficult task when confronted by Gorgos, a trickster god who appears in each myth to try to change it. Alex's initial journey into the Cyber Museum is an accident, but soon they both begin searching for their father within the myths. As the series progresses, they realize that their search is much more important than they first realized, as Gorgos is bent on wiping out entire cultures by corrupting their mythologies.

It was shot in Drumheller, Calgary, East Coulee, Alberta, and Regina, Saskatchewan.

The series is not currently available on DVD or video. However, there have been novels adapted from the first three episodes as well as "Minokichi," written by Dan Danko, Tom Mason, and John Whitman.

Cast
 Christopher Jacot as Alex Bellows
 Meredith Henderson as Cleo Bellows
 Wendy Anderson as Lily Bellows
 Mathew Walker as Max Asher
 Joseph Kell as Matt Bellows
 Michelle Goh as Yuki / Yuni-Onna

Episodes
"The Minotaur": Matt Bellows "borrows" a statue of Heng-O to upload into his precious CyberMuseum, but inadvertently releases Gorgos and is cursed to wander from myth to myth. Shortly thereafter, Alex and Cleo discover the CyberMuseum's ability to transport them into myths when Alex accidentally takes the place of Theseus. 
"Hammer of the Gods": Alex assumes the role of one of Loki's sons and tries to convince Thor to release his erstwhile friend, unaware of the crimes Loki is accused of.
"Red Wolf's Daughter": Cleo discovers that she can walk when inside a myth, as she takes on the role of a Nez Perce chieftain's daughter caught in a doomed romance. 
"Orpheus": Alex visits the underworld on the off-chance his father is dead, but Hades assures him this is not the case. Cleo, meanwhile, must convince him to put aside his mounting feelings for Eurydice to preserve the myth. 
"Minokichi": Cleo must convince Alex that his idyllic life in ancient Japan is built around a dark and dangerous secret.
"Sir Caradoc at the Round Table": Alex and Cleo try to consult Camelot's library about their father and the Gorgos stone, but Merlin, aware of Alex's true identity, convinces him to try and change the fate of Lancelot and Guinevere.
"The Doppelgänger": Alex narrowly escapes from his latest foray into the CyberMuseum, but something isn't quite right. Gorgos at last reveals his hand in events.
"The Oracle": Cleo visits ancient Delphi consult the Oracle about their father, but winds up taking the place of the Oracle herself. 
"Isis and Osiris (1)": Following a tip from Apollo, Alex becomes Osiris to finally locate his father. Unfortunately, he's arrived in mythical Egypt just as Set is preparing to betray his brother. 
"Isis and Osiris (2)": Cleo assumes the role of Isis and reunites at last with her father. As the pair set out to restore Alex (Osiris), their path is blocked at every turn by Set... and Gorgos. 
"Blodeuwedd": After a grim discovery in the CyberMuseum, Cleo takes on the role of a Welsh princess in order to consult the Druids, but things don't go exactly as planned.
"The Blessing": Struggles with her disability prompt Cleo to take shelter in an African myth to take her mind off things and restore her resolve.
"Quetzalcoatl": Alex enters Toltec mythology, and from Quetzalcoatl develops a new appreciation for knowledge and the people who teach it, but remains oblivious to Tezcatlipoca's sinister plans. Meanwhile, Cleo deals with a stranger in the real world who's asking all the wrong questions.

References

External links
 

2000s Canadian children's television series
2001 Canadian television series debuts
2001 Canadian television series endings
Canadian children's education television series
English-language television shows
PBS Kids shows
PBS original programming
Television series about teenagers
Television shows filmed in Calgary
Television shows filmed in Regina, Saskatchewan
Works based on mythology